Jolanta Emilia Hibner (born 26 January 1951 in Ząbki) is a Polish politician. 
She was elected to the Sejm on 25 September 2005, getting 3512 votes in 19 Warsaw district as a candidate from the Civic Platform list. She was re-elected on 21 October 2007.

On 7 June 2009 Jolanta Hibner was elected Member of European Parliament from Masovian Voivodeship constituency.

See also
Members of Polish Sejm 2005-2007
Members of Polish Sejm 2007-2011

External links
Jolanta Hibner - parliamentary page - includes declarations of interest, voting record, and transcripts of speeches.
 Jolanta Hibner - private website

1951 births
Living people
Members of the Polish Sejm 2005–2007
Members of the Polish Sejm 2007–2011
Members of the Polish Sejm 2015–2019
Members of the Senate of Poland 2019–2023
Civic Platform politicians
Civic Platform MEPs
MEPs for Poland 2009–2014
Women MEPs for Poland
Women members of the Sejm of the Republic of Poland
Women members of the Senate of Poland
People from Wołomin County
21st-century Polish women politicians